This is a list of tennis players who have represented the Romania Davis Cup team in an official Davis Cup match. Romania have taken part in the competition since 1922.

Players

References

Lists of Davis Cup tennis players
Davis Cup